Anandan Gunasekaran (born 18 March 1987; Kumbakonam, Tamil Nadu) is an Indian track and field para-athletics runner who competes in the men's 100m, 200m and 400m events in the T64 category. He has participated at many international events. In 2018, he represented India at the Asian Para Games 2018 which was held in Jakarta, Indonesia from 6 to 13 October 2018 and won silver in the 400 meters and bronze in the 200 meters. He is the first athlete in the country to have won 3 gold medals in the Military World Games 2019 held in Wuhan, China, first Asian blade runner to create a new Asian record of completing 400m race in 52.66s at the 2018 National Open Para-Athletic Championship. 

In 2016, Anandan set a new Asian record in the men's 400m by clocking 54.67s at the 2016 Asian Para Athletics Championships. He is also the first Indian blade runner to create two Asian records in the 400m. He was an abled body athlete before he lost a leg in an explosion that occurred along the LoC.

Early life 
Anandan was born in Kumbakonam, Tamil Nadu on 18 March, 1987. As a 3 year old, he used to actively run around his kindergarten school Shankara Vidyala School. In grade 6 in Native Higher Secondary School, he had secured the first prize in 800m and 1500m race. 

Born into a poor family, Anandan used to distribute newspapers to financially contribute to his father's income. One day, his cycle was punctured, so he continued the job running. It started as a fun activity, but he was soon running at state and national level events. By the twelfth standard, Anandan was all in as a serious runner. Inspired by the story of Indian soldiers at Kargil War, Anandan went into the army. In a training camp in Banglore, he ran a 12 km track which got him into the army's team. However, sports needed plenty of nutritional supplements, and on his salary, Anandan struggled to get it. But he continued to participate in racing competitions and brought the country numerous prizes. 

In 2008, he was posted in Kupwara district of Jammu and Kashmir. He got injured in an explosion that took place along the Line of Control (LoC) and lost a leg. In 2012, Anandan ran 2.5 km in 9 min 58 sec in Mumbai marathon disabled category.

Career 
Anandan represented India at the 2017 IPC World Para Athletics Championships in London. He also represented India at the 2019 Military World Games and claimed three gold medals in athletics events.

Achievements

International competitions

National competitions

References

Further reading

External links 

 Anandan Gunasekaran at International Paralympic Committee

1987 births
Living people
People from Thanjavur
Track and field athletes with disabilities
Indian male sprinters
Medalists at the 2018 Asian Para Games